The 1991 UEFA Cup Final was a football tie played on 8 May 1991 and 22 May 1991 to determine the champion of the 1990–91 UEFA Cup. It was contested across two legs between Italian sides Internazionale and Roma. Inter won 2–1 on aggregate after winning the first leg 2–0 but losing the second 1–0.

Route to the final

Match details

First leg

Second leg

See also
1990–91 UEFA Cup
A.S. Roma in European football
Inter Milan in European football
Italian football clubs in international competitions

References
RSSSF

1990–91 in European football
Inter Milan matches
A.S. Roma matches
1991
1990–91 in Italian football
International club association football competitions hosted by Italy
Final
May 1991 sports events in Europe
1991 UEFA Cup Fina
1991 UEFA Cup Fina
Sports competitions in Rome
Sports competitions in Milan